Dichomeris inserrata, the indented dichomeris, is a moth of the family Gelechiidae. It is found in the United States, including New Jersey, Missouri, Pennsylvania and Florida.

The wingspan is 5.4-8.3 mm.

The larvae feed on goldenrod.

External links
Images
Bug Guide. Species Dichomeris inserrata - Indented Dichomeris Moth - Hodges#2297

Moths described in 1882
inserrata